Alan Lau may refer to:

 Alan Chong Lau (born 1948), American poet and artist
 Alan Kin-Tak Lau, Hong Kong engineer and academic